Thomas Hubbard or Tom Hubbard  may refer to:

Thomas H. Hubbard (1781–1857), American lawyer, judge and U.S. Representative from New York
Thomas Jefferson Hubbard (1806–1877), Oregon pioneer and politician who was acquitted of murder charges
Thomas Hamlin Hubbard (1838–1915), Union Army colonel from Maine during the Civil War
Thomas Hubbard (British politician) (1898–1961), British coal miner and politician
Thomas C. Hubbard (born 1943), diplomat and United States Ambassador to the Philippines, 1996–2000, and South Korea, 2001–04
Tom Hubbard (born 1950), writer and first librarian of the Scottish Poetry Library
Tommy Hubbard, music producer

See also
Thomas Hubbard Sumner (1807–1876), sea captain
Thomas Hubbard Vail (1821–1889), first Episcopal Bishop of Kansas
Cape Thomas Hubbard, a headland located in the northern Canadian territory of Nunavut
Hubbard (surname)